Arborg is a town located 103 kilometres north of Winnipeg, at the junction of Manitoba Highways 7 and 68, in the Interlake Region of Manitoba, Canada. The town is surrounded by the Municipality of Bifrost - Riverton and has a population of 1,222 as of the Canada 2016 Census.

History 

The picturesque setting along the Icelandic River was first settled in the late 19th century. Its first postal address was Ardal (Icelandic Árdalur, meaning "River Valley"), but in 1910 when the Canadian Pacific Railway reached the settlement, the name was changed to Arborg (Árborg, meaning "River Town"). The original railway station from 1910 still stands and is today recognized as a heritage site. The building has been converted into a public library.

Icelanders established homesteads to the east, west, north, and south of the village, and by 1908 the first Polish and Ukrainian settlers had arrived in the area. The coming of the railroad brought large numbers of Ukrainians who settled throughout the district along with groups from other European countries. This mixture gave Arborg a rich cultural diversity and its own distinct character. The many different churches, the ethnic foods and the social activities are all evidence of the cultural complexity of the town.

Today, Arborg serves as a regional business hub for the Municipality of Bifrost-Riverton which is home to grain farming, cattle ranches, and numerous manufacturing companies. Arborg offers government services, financial services, retail, construction supplies, and agricultural implements.

Arborg has two schools- Arborg Collegiate Institute and Arborg Early Middle Years School with enrolments of 119 and 241 students in September 2019, respectively.

Demographics 

Arborg & District Multicultural Heritage Village

The Arborg & District Multicultural Heritage Village is a working open-air museum and interpretive centre located just outside the town on Highway 68, on the south side of the Icelandic River. It preserves and showcases the multicultural history of the area. The very first building, the Trausti Vigfusson house, was moved on site by a team of horses, commemorating the community spirit that built the area in the early 1900s. This log house was built around 1898 and originally stood in Lundi (today Riverton). Vigfusson, its original owner and builder, transported it to the nearby Geysir settlement in 1902.

The Arborg & District Multicultural Heritage Village is a community concept envisioned to promote and preserve for tomorrow those memories of the past. The Heritage Village had its grand opening May 24, 2008. To date a hall, church, caboose, outdoor bake oven and three houses have been completed. A school has been moved on the site and is currently awaiting restoration along with a foreman's rail car. Two Ukrainian log houses, a windmill as well as numerous farm equipment and artifacts have been added to the village in 2010.

World's largest curling rock
Unlike an actual curling rock however, it is constructed with steel, foam, and fiberglass, with most of the weight consisting in the steel support beams.

Notable person
James Reimer, goaltender for the San Jose Sharks

Climate
Arborg has a similar summer to other prairie cities with an August high of 24.0C, compared with 22.5C in Calgary or 24.4C in Saskatoon. Winters are cold and Spring and Fall contain pleasant weather. Annual precipitation equals 506.1mm (19.9 inches).

References

External links

Towns in Manitoba